The Widowmaker is a 1990 made-for-television film directed by John Madden and starring Annabelle Apsion,  Alun Armstrong, David Morrissey and Kenneth Welsh. The film deals with a woman whose husband has been arrested after going on a killing rampage and the reaction of her local community. It was produced In the United Kingdom by Central Independent Television for the ITV Network and aired on 29 December 1990. It received a nomination for Best Single Drama at the 1991 BAFTA Awards.

Premise
Kathy (Apsion) is forced to face the hostility of her local community after her husband is revealed as a brutal spree killer.

Cast

Annabelle Apsion – Kathy
Alun Armstrong – Dad
David Morrissey – Rob
Kenneth Welsh – Atkinson
Helen Anderson – Troy
Hugh Armstrong – Michael Finch
Al Hunter Ashton – Mr. Wilding
Charlotte Barker – Vicky Pierce
Sydnee Blake – Grieving Mother
Kate Byers – Junior Police Officer
Flaminia Cinque – Sally
David Credell – Builder 3
Richard Cubison – Dr. Beloff
Aaron Dawson – Tom
Peter Guinness – Detective Sergeant Wills
Jane Gurnett – Sharon
Brian Hickey – Malcolm
Caroline Holdaway – Teacher
Colin Jeavons – Mr. Crathew
Karl Jenkinson – Builder 2
Kate Lanson – Prostitute
Mike Lunney – Housing Officer
Gareth Marks – Barry
Neale McGrath – Builder 1
Eileen Nicholas – Mum
James Ottaway – Mourner
Gary Powell – Journalist
Bill Rourke – Minicab Driver
Martin Sadler – Senior Police Officer
Colin Simmonds – DHSS Officer
Peter Williams – Philip Newsome
Tessa Wojtczak – Sheila Barton
 Darren Wilkes - Moustashioed Armed Police Officer

External links

1990 television films
1990 films
British television films
Films directed by John Madden
Films scored by Rachel Portman
Television series by ITV Studios
Television shows produced by Central Independent Television
English-language television shows